Steal may refer to:
 Theft, the illegal act of taking another person's property without that person's freely-given consent
 The gaining of a stolen base in baseball
 the 2004 ALCS stolen base in Game Four, see Dave Roberts (outfielder)
 Steal (basketball), a situation when a defensive player actively takes possession of the ball from an offensive player
 Steal (curling), score/win by a team that did not throw the last rock
 Steal (film), a 2002 action film
 Steal (game show), a Central Television game show
 Steal (poker), a type of a bluff
 The Steal, the British melodic hardcore punk band
 The Steal (album), a 2006 album by The Steal
 The Steal (film), a 1995 British comedy thriller film
 a discount
 Steal, a gameplay element in the reality franchise series The Voice

See also 
 Stole (disambiguation)
 Stolen (disambiguation)